James Michael "Staff" Garvey (13 December 1899October 1987) was an Irish hurler who played club hurling with Cappataggle. He was a member of the Galway team that won the 1923 All-Ireland Championship.

References

1899 births
1987 deaths
Cappataggle hurlers
Galway inter-county hurlers